This is a list of self-help organizations.

Twelve-step programs 
Recovery programs using Alcoholics Anonymous' twelve steps and twelve traditions either in their original form or by changing only the alcohol-specific references:

 Alcoholics Anonymous (AA)
 Emotions Anonymous (EA)
 Marijuana Anonymous
 Sexaholics Anonymous (SA)
 Overeaters Anonymous (OA)
 Food Addicts in Recovery Anonymous (FA)
 GROW

Non-Twelve-Step recovery programs 
 LifeRing Secular Recovery
 Rational Recovery
 Narconon
 Recovery International (formerly Recovery, Inc.)
 Depression and Bipolar Support Alliance - DBSA
 Parents Anonymous
 SMART Recovery
 Refuge Recovery

Other programs (not recovery oriented) 
 Toastmasters International
 Self-help (law)
 Self-help group (finance)

See also 
 Self-help
 Support group

Self-help
Self-care